Portland is a neighborhood located within the Mitchells Plain urban area of the City of Cape Town in the Western Cape province of South Africa. It is located within the central area of Mitchells Plain with Mitchells Plain Town Centre located to its immediate east. 

Educational institutions located in the area include Portland High School, Mondale High School, Montagu Drive Primary School, Jamaica Way Primary School, Wespoort Primary School, Portland Primary School, and Liesbeeck Primary. False Bay Collage's campus in Mitchells Plain is located in the neighborhood.

References

Suburbs of Cape Town